Salvatore Margarita (born 29 April 1990) is an Italian footballer who plays for ASD Monticelli as a midfielder.

Biography
Born in Maddaloni, Campania region, Margarita started his professional career at Marche club Ascoli. He made his Serie B debut on 23 January 2010 against Modena. That season he played a total of 5 Serie B games.

In June 2010 50% registration rights of Margarita and Giorgio Capece were sold to Calcio Catania for a total of €2 million (€1.3 million for Margarita, €700,00 for Capece), however Ascoli only received 50% registration rights of Federico Moretti also "worth" €2 million. The notional €4 million selling revenue had boosted the result of Ascoli's financial year ending on 30 June 2010, but the financial trick also created a financial burden in the next 5 seasons to counter-weight the spending on transfer fee. Margarita and Capece also returned to Ascoli in temporary deal for 2010–11 Serie B. In June 2011 all 3 players returned to their mother clubs, yet another financial trick benefiting Ascoli.

On 30–31 August 2011 Margarita, Capece and Rosania (who returned from Chievo) were signed by the third division club Lanciano in temporary deal, for free, despite they had a total of €5 million price tag in accounting due to swap deals in June 2011. Margarita also played his last game for Ascoli on 30 August. At the end of season Lanciano promoted to Serie B. Margarita made 1 starts and 13 substitutes for the promotion winner. On 1 July 2012 all 3 players returned to Ascoli.

On 22 August 2012 Margarita left for the fourth division club Venezia in another temporary deal. At the end of season Margarita returned to Ascoli, which the club had relegated from Serie B to Lega Pro Prima Divisione.

On 24 August 2013 Margarita was signed by another fourth division club Sorrento, also from Campania. On 17 December 2013 Ascoli bankrupted, with a new company takeover the assets for €862,000 only, which write-down the residual value of player assets to zero, including Margarita, Capece and Rosania "worth" around €1.875 million on 31 December 2013 in accounting. That season Margarita made 5 starts and 2 substitute for Sorrento; the club failed to win the playoffs round of 2013–14 Lega Pro Seconda Divisione in order to remain in Lega Pro, which also saw the two divisions of Lega Pro league had been merged, as well as from 69 teams to 60 teams.

On 29 January 2015 he was signed by Lupa Roma.

On 5 September 2015 he was signed by Monticelli.

On 9 July 2016 he was signed by Fermana F.C.

Footnotes

References

External links
 AIC profile 
 Lega Serie B profile 
 

Italian footballers
Ascoli Calcio 1898 F.C. players
S.S. Virtus Lanciano 1924 players
Venezia F.C. players
Serie B players
Serie C players
Association football midfielders
Sportspeople from the Province of Caserta
Footballers from Campania
1990 births
Living people